Satrio "Billy" Budihardjo Joedono (December 1, 1932 – April 16, 2017) was an Indonesian economist. He graduated at the top level from Canisius College.

Career
Joedono served as the Minister of Trade of Indonesia from 1993 to 1995. In November 1995 the Department of Trade was merged with the Ministry of Industry and a Ministry of Industry and Trade (Depperindag) was established.  Later, Joedono was appointed to the key position of Chair of the Audit Board of Indonesia, holding this position from 1998 to 2004.

External links
  Profile in tokohindonesia.com
  Satrio dies
  Profile on ABI website

1932 births
2017 deaths
People from Pangkal Pinang
Government ministers of Indonesia
Indonesian economists
Canisius College alumni